The God Committee is a 2021 American drama film, adapted and directed by Austin Stark, based on the play of the same name by Mark St. Germain. It stars Kelsey Grammer, Julia Stiles, Janeane Garofalo, Dan Hedaya, and Colman Domingo. The film focuses on organ transplant systems and the impact they have on the people involved.

The film had its world premiere at the Tribeca Film Festival on June 20, 2021. It was released on July 2, 2021, by Vertical Entertainment.

Plot
An organ transplant committee has one hour to decide which of three patients deserves a life-saving heart. Seven years later, the committee members struggle with the consequences of that fateful decision.

Cast
 Kelsey Grammer as Dr. Andre Boxer
 Julia Stiles as Dr. Jordan Taylor
 Colman Domingo as Father Dunbar
 Janeane Garofalo as Dr. Valerie Gilroy
 Dan Hedaya as Emmett Granger
Peter Kim as Dr. Allen Lau
Patricia R. Floyd as Nurse Wilkes

Production
In March 2019, it was announced Kelsey Grammer, Julia Stiles, Colman Domingo, Janeane Garofalo, and Dan Hedaya had joined the cast of the film, with Austin Stark directing from a screenplay he wrote.

Principal photography began in March 2019.

Release
The film had its world premiere at the Tribeca Film Festival on June 20, 2021. Prior to, Vertical Entertainment acquired distribution rights to the film, and set it for a July 2, 2021, release. It was previously scheduled to premiere at the Tribeca Film Festival in April 2020, but the festival was delayed due to the COVID-19 pandemic.

Reception
The God Committee received mixed reviews. On the review aggregator website Rotten Tomatoes, the film has a 64% approval rating, based on 28 reviews, with an average rating of 6.6/10. The website's consensus reads, "The God Committees strong cast and compelling ethical dilemma are ill served by a convoluted story with a disappointing tendency toward melodrama."

References

External links
 

Films postponed due to the COVID-19 pandemic
American drama films
Films shot in New York City
Films scored by the Newton Brothers
Vertical Entertainment films
2020s English-language films
2020s American films